The Lévis Forts were a series of three forts located on the South Shore of the Saint Lawrence River in Lévis, Quebec, Canada. They were at shooting distance of one another which allowed the defense of a wide area without the cost of a continuous defensive wall.  The first one was built (1865-1872) by the British Army and the other ones by private businesses (1865-1869).  The costs were almost identical for all three, ranging from 57,600 to 59,762 pounds.

During the American Civil War, Great Britain claimed to remain neutral in the conflict. However, the cotton directly imported from the south of the United States still had a great importance in the British textile industry. Following the Civil War, the British were still expecting an American invasion of Canada.

The tense political relationship between Austria and Prussia had the British worried about their wood supply, if the access to the Baltic Sea was blocked. The Canadian forests would then be used as Great Britain's main wood supply.

Lieutenant-Colonel William Jervois was sent to Canada to establish the Canadian defence plan. He suggested that detached forts be built on Pointe-Lévy, on the south shore of Quebec City. The original plans recommended 5 forts, of which 3 were actually built. None of the three were ever occupied as they were no longer considered necessary after the signing of the Treaty of Washington in 1871.

Lévis Forts National Historic Site

Fort No. 1 has been restored and is now a National Historic Site of Canada known as Lévis Forts National Historic Site.  The casemates of the star-shaped fort feature exhibits about the history and military life of the fort, and include a multimedia presentation, scale models, period illustrations, interactive games, and antique tools and materials.  Guided tours are offered of the casemates, tunnels and underground chambers, and visitors can take self-guided tours of the outdoor rolling bridge, terreplein, powder magazines, and caponiers.

Affiliations
The Museum is affiliated with: CMA,  CHIN, and Virtual Museum of Canada.

References

External links
 Lévis Forts National Historic Site - official site

National Historic Sites in Quebec
Museums in Chaudière-Appalaches
Military and war museums in Canada
History museums in Quebec
Buildings and structures in Lévis, Quebec
Military forts in Quebec
Forts or trading posts on the National Historic Sites of Canada register
1865 establishments in Canada